"My Second Home" is a song co-written and recorded by American country music singer Tracy Lawrence. It was released on September 16, 1993, as the third single from his album, Alibis. The song reached the top of the Billboard Hot Country Singles & Tracks (now Hot Country Songs) chart and peaked at number 6 on the Canadian RPM Country Tracks chart. It was written by Lawrence with Paul Nelson and Kenny Beard.

Content
"My Second Home" is an uptempo honky-tonker in which the bar that the narrator considers his "second home" becomes his only home after his wife kicks him out.

Music video
The music video was directed by Marc Ball and premiered in September 1993. It is a live performance, and features cameos from future superstars and newcomers Toby Keith (eating ice cream), future collaborator Tim McGraw as a vocal member, Clay Walker as a duet partner during the first chorus, and Shania Twain as a tambourine player, as well as established stars Lynn Anderson as a keyboardist, Holly Dunn as an acoustic guitar player, and John Anderson, Tanya Tucker and William Lee Golden of the Oak Ridge Boys as backup singers. (Ball directed not only most of Lawrence's videos until 2001, but also the majority of Keith's early music videos until 1997).

Chart positions
"My Second Home" debuted at number 73 on the U.S. Billboard Hot Country Singles & Tracks for the week of September 4, 1993.

References

1993 singles
1993 songs
Tracy Lawrence songs
Song recordings produced by James Stroud
Atlantic Records singles
Songs written by Tracy Lawrence
Songs written by Kenny Beard
Songs written by Paul Nelson (songwriter)